|}
Michael James Palmer (born 27 January 1953) is a former Australian politician and a children's book author. He moved to Darwin in 1960 and was a Country Liberal Party member of the Northern Territory Legislative Assembly from 1983 to 2001, representing Leanyer until 1987 and Karama thereafter. He was defeated by Labor candidate Delia Lawrie at the 2001 election.

References

1953 births
Living people
Members of the Northern Territory Legislative Assembly
Country Liberal Party members of the Northern Territory Legislative Assembly
21st-century Australian politicians